is a village located in Ōno District, Gifu Prefecture, Japan. It is best known for being the site of Shirakawa-gō, a small, traditional village showcasing a building style known as gasshō-zukuri. Together with Gokayama in Nanto, Toyama, it is one of UNESCO's World Heritage Sites.

,  the village had an estimated population of 1,630 in 588 households and a population density of 4.6 persons per km2.

Geography
Shirakawa is a mountain village located in far northern Gifu Prefecture, bordering Ishikawa Prefecture and Toyama Prefecture on the Ryōhaku Mountains. The village's area is 95.7% mountainous forests, and its steep places are characteristic. In between the mountains flows the Shō River, which continues to the north into Nanto, Toyama. Most of the population is in its river valley. Since the opening of Hida Tunnel, Shirakawa can be reached within 50 minutes from Takayama, Gifu compared to the earlier three hour drive, and only an hour to Nanto in Toyama.

Neighbouring municipalities
 Gifu Prefecture
 Takayama
 Hida
 Toyama Prefecture
 Nanto
 Ishikawa Prefecture
 Hakusan

Climate
Shirakawa Village has a humid continental climate (Koppen Dfa). It features four distinct seasons with winter being its most recognised. Shirakawa is noted as one of the snowiest places in Japan. Yearly average snowfall amounts average out in excess of 10 meters (415.4") with snowbanks developing well over 2 meters tall. As a consequence of the frequent heavy snow, characteristically thick thatched roofed  gasshō-zukuri (合掌造り) houses were created.  With the  Hakusan National Park mountain ranges as a background, these sites are major tourist attractions.

Demographics
Per Japanese census data, the population of Shirakawa has decreased over the past 50 years, with a small uptick around the year 2000.

History
The area around Shirakawa was part of traditional Hida Province.  During the post-Meiji restoration cadastral reforms, the area was organised into Ōno District, Gifu. The village of Shirakawa was formed on July 1, 1897 with the establishment of the modern municipalities system.

Economy
The local economy is dominated strongly by seasonal tourism. Due to the income from the tourists who came to see the gassho-zukuri villages, the financial condition of the village has been greatly improved, and tourist traffic increased further once the village became a UNESCO site. However, the increasing number of visitors has resulted in damage to the area from pollution, and by local inhabitants turning their homes into hostels, gift shops and parking lots, which in turn has endangered its World Heritage status. There is also a fear growing that the change to catering to tourists will harm the charm of the area's simplicity and fundamental Japanese scenery.

Education
Shirakawa has one combined public elementary/junior high school operated by the village government. The town village does not have a high school.

Transportation

Railway 
Shirakawa village does not have any passenger railway service.

Highway
 Tōkai-Hokuriku Expressway

Sister city relations
 - Alberobello, Apulia, Italy, since March 3, 2005.

Local attractions
 The Historic Villages of Shirakawa-gō and Gokayama are designated UNESCO World Heritage sites
 Wadake Home—the largest gasshō-zukuri in the area
 Shirakawa-gō Hirase Onsen (designated as a "national recuperation onsen")
 Miboro dam, Lake Miboro
 Hida Tunnel
 Hakusan Rindō (hiking path)
 , famous for its fall colors; 30 minutes away by foot is the Kōsō wetlands, also famous
 Shirakawa Hachiman Shrine, where every October 14–15, the Doburoku Festival, famous for its Nigorizake, is held

Gallery

In popular culture
In Gosho Aoyama's Detective Conan manga series, Onizawa village from episodes 348-349, is modeled from real life Shirakawa.
The final issue of Uncanny X-Force Vol. 1 opens with Wolverine visiting Shirakawa.
The village of Minasato in the kemono visual novel Morenatsu (summer vacation) is based heavily off of Shirakawa.

Access
Kaetsunō Bus Shirakawa-go Bus Terminal
World Heritage Site Bus is run by this company from Takaoka Station (Toyama) via Shin-Takaoka Station.

See also 
 Historic Villages of Shirakawa-go and Gokayama
 Gokayama

References

External links 

 Shirakawa official website  (some English content)
 UNESCO entry on Shirakawa-go and Gokayama
 Information related to Shirakawa-go on the official Gifu tourism website
 shirakawa-go.gr

 
World Heritage Sites in Japan
Villages in Gifu Prefecture